The BeBox is a dual CPU personal computer, briefly sold by Be Inc. to run the company's own operating system, BeOS. It has PowerPC CPUs, its I/O board has a custom "GeekPort", and the front bezel has "Blinkenlights".

The BeBox made its debut in October 1995 in a dual PowerPC 603 at 66 MHz configuration. The processors were upgraded to 133 MHz in August 1996 (BeBox Dual603e-133). Production was halted in January 1997, following the port of BeOS to the Macintosh, in order for the company to concentrate on software. Be sold around 1000 66 MHz BeBoxes and 800 133 MHz BeBoxes.

BeBox creator Jean-Louis Gassée did not see the BeBox as a general consumer device, warning that "Before we let you use the BeBox, we believe you must have some aptitude toward programming the standard language is C++."

CPU configuration 
Initial prototypes are equipped with two AT&T Hobbit processors and three AT&T 9308S DSPs.

Production models use two 66 MHz PowerPC 603 processors or two 133 MHz PowerPC 603e processors to power the BeBox. Prototypes having dual 200 MHz CPUs or four CPUs exist, but were never publicly available.

Main Board 
The main board is in a standard AT format commonly found on PC. It uses standard PC components to make it as inexpensive as possible.

 Two PowerPC 603/66 MHz or 603e/133 MHz processors
 Eight 72-pin SIMM sockets
 128 KB Flash ROM
 Three PCI slots
 Five ISA slots
 Internal SCSI connector
 Internal IDE connector
 Internal floppy connector
 External SCSI-2 connector
 Parallel port
 Keyboard port, AT-style
 Three GeekPort fuses
 I/O Board connector
 Front panel connector
 Power connector

I/O Board 

The I/O board offers four serial ports (9-pin D-sub), a PS/2 mouse port, two joystick ports (15-pin D-sub). 

There are four DIN MIDI ports, two in and two out, two pairs (for stereo) of RCA connectors audio line-level input and output, a pair of 3.5 mm stereo phono jacks for microphone input and headphone output. There are also internal audio connectors: 5-pin strip for the audio CD line-level playback, and two 4-pin strips for microphone input and headphone output. The audio is produced with a 16-bit DAC stereo sound system capable of 48 kHz and 44.1 kHz.

For the more unusual uses, there are three 4-pin mini DIN infrared (IR) I/O ports.

An experimental-electronic-development oriented port, backed by three fuses on the mainboard, the 37-pin D-sub "GeekPort" provides Digital and analog I/O and DC power on the ISA bus:
 Two independent, bidirectional 8-bit ports
 Four A/D pins routing to a 12-bit A/D converter
 Four D/A pins connected to an independent 8-bit D/A converter
 Two signal ground reference pins
 Eleven power and ground pins: Two at +5 V, one at +12 V, one at -12 V, seven ground pins

"Blinkenlights" 
Two yellow/green vertical LED arrays, dubbed the "blinkenlights", are built into the front bezel to illustrate the CPU load. The bottommost LED on the right side indicates hard disk activity.

See also 
 Multi Emulator Super System (MESS) able to emulate both BeBox 66 and 133

References

External links 
   An interview with Be Inc. CEO Jean-Louis Gassée and VP of Engineering Erich Ringewald.
 
 
 BeBox Photo Gallery (Joseph Palmer: Be HW Engineer)
  (BeBox)

Be Inc.
Computer-related introductions in 1995
Computer workstations
Personal computers
PowerPC computers